Saint Martin's University is a private Benedictine university in Lacey, Washington. It was founded in 1895 as an all-boys boarding school by monks of the Benedictine Order. Saint Martin's began offering college-level courses in 1900 and became a degree-granting institution in 1940. The college became coeducational in 1965. In 2005, it changed its name from Saint Martin's College to Saint Martin's University. It has a functioning Benedictine monastery on school grounds and some members of the monastic community also serve as professors.

History
Saint Martin's patron saint is Saint Martin of Tours, a fourth-century monk and missionary, and later Bishop of Tours. The site was selected in 1894 by Abbot Bernard Locnikar, O.S.B., of Saint John's Abbey, Collegeville, Minnesota, which was the mother abbey of St. Martin's Abbey. At a public auction on April 21, 1894, the wooded parcel that would become the Saint Martin's campus was purchased for $6,920.

Work began on Saint Martin's first building in January 1895, and by late summer, a four-story structure housing both the school and a monastery was completed. The school at that time offered preparatory classes for boys, plus commercial and classical education for older boys and young men. Boarding students who came from outside of town also were housed in the campus' one large building. Today, that structure is referred to as Old Main and continues to house many of the university's classrooms and offices.

Presidents
 1955-1959 Father Damian Glenn, OSB
 1959-1964 Father Dunstan Curtis, OSB
 1964-1971 Father Michael Feeney, OSB 
 1971-1975 Father Matthew Naumes 
 1975-1980 Father John Scott, OSB
 1980-1984 John Ishii 
 1984-2005 David Spangler 
 2005-2008 Douglas Astolfi
 2008 Bryan M. Johnston, J.D. (Deceased; never formally inaugurated)
 2008-2008 David Spangler (Interim)
 2009-2022 Roy F. Heynderickx 
 2022-present Jennifer Bonds-Raacke

Academics
The college offers 28 baccalaureate programs and fourteen graduate degree programs, and it is best known for its civil & mechanical engineering, business administration, and education programs. The university offers programs and courses at Joint Base Lewis-McChord and Centralia College. The school's education is based around a liberal arts core with an emphasis on Benedictine values.

Colleges and schools
 College of Arts and Sciences
 College of Education and Counseling
 Hal and Inge Marcus School of Engineering
 School of Business

Sister schools
Saint Martin's has “sister university” agreements with four Korean universities; Sogang University, Konkuk University, Cheongju University and Sangmyung University. Saint Martin's also has sister universities in other Asian countries, including five in Japan (including Mukogawa Women's University and Reitaku University), three in China (including Shanghai Maritime University), and one in Taiwan (Chung Shan Medical University).

Student life

Residence halls
 Baran Hall — Three-story dormitory for upperclassmen
 Burton Hall — Apartment-style facility for returning students; houses campus medical center
 Spangler Hall — Built in 2005; houses returning students
 Parsons Hall — Built in 2008; houses students from all classes (but mostly freshmen)

Sustainability and technology
In the fall semester, 2012, a new 22,000+ square foot engineering building, Cebula Hall, opened.  The building was awarded LEED platinum standard. Harned Hall is in accordance with LEED green standards.

Under a new environmental program, between August 29 and December 11, 2008, the cafeteria collected an average of 243 pounds of compostables a day. The composting program took about 27,216 pounds of materials out of the waste stream in Thurston County in the fall semester alone.

The Learning Garden was started at SMU in 2010.

Athletics

The school's sports teams participate in the NCAA's Great Northwest Athletic Conference at the Division II level. The women's basketball team qualified for the NCAA Division II tournament in 1992 and 2008. In the 1940s and 1950s, Saint Martin's had a men's college football team and a boys' high school football team, which won the Washington Class A championship. In the 1990s, the name of the mascot was almost changed to the Ravens. In 2008, the men's basketball team defeated Division I Colorado State Rams men's basketball, making it Saint Martin's first major publicized victory over a D-1 opponent. In 2009, the Men's Soccer team seized the first team title in any sport for Saint Martin's University, winning the Great Northwest Athletic Conference. In 2010, the university hosted a training camp which featured the University of Washington Huskies Men's Basketball Team.

Notable people

Alumni
 Jill Lannan, Air National Guard Brigadier General
 Clement Leroy "Butch" Otter, 32nd Governor of Idaho 
 Kyle Sokol, bass guitarist for Rude Squad
 Former Major League Baseball players Justin Leone and Dick Ward
 Mike Thibault, NBA and WNBA coach

Faculty
 David Price, anthropologist

References

External links

 
 St. Martin's University athletics website
 St. Martin's Abbey

 
Educational institutions established in 1895
1895 establishments in Washington (state)
Lacey, Washington
Universities and colleges accredited by the Northwest Commission on Colleges and Universities
Benedictine colleges and universities
Universities and colleges in Olympia, Washington
Catholic universities and colleges in Washington (state)
Roman Catholic Archdiocese of Seattle